Silene yunnanensis is a plant species native to central southern parts of China. It goes by the common name Chinese catchfly.

References 

yunnanensis